Dokkaebi are legendary creatures from Korean mythology and folklore. Dokkaebi, also known as "Korean goblins", are nature deities or spirits possessing extraordinary powers and abilities that are used to interact with humans, at times playing tricks on them and at times helping them. Legends describe different dokkaebi in many forms and beings with a thousand faces, and dokkaebi often wear hanbok.

Origins
The earliest known documentation of dokkaebi is in the Silla-era tale of "Lady Dohwa and Bachelor Bihyeong" from the Memorabilia of the Three Kingdoms compiled during the Goryeo period. Dokkaebi are featured in many folk tale anthologies compiled during the Joseon period.

Characteristics
Dokkaebi are different from ghosts, called gwishin in Korean, in that they are not formed by the death of a human being, but rather by the spiritual possession of an inanimate object such as old discarded household tools like brooms, or objects stained with human blood.

The physical appearance of the dokkaebi is presented in many different ways and has varied by different time periods, but they have always been depicted as fearsome and awe-inspiring. The most common depiction of them is based on ancient roof tiles with dokkaebi patterns.

Different versions of the dokkaebi mythology assign different attributes to them. In some cases, they are considered harmless but nevertheless mischievous, usually playing pranks on people or challenging wayward travelers to a ssireum (Korean wrestling) match for the right to pass. Dokkaebi are extremely skilled at wrestling and cannot be beaten unless their right side is exploited. In other tales, dokkaebi only have one leg, so one should hook their leg and push them to win.

Dokkaebi fire is a glimmering light or tall blue flames that herald the appearance of dokkaebi.

Dokkaebi like Buckwheat jelly, Sorghum and red bean rice cakes, mashed Sorghum and the drinks. So in dokkaebi gosa (Hangul: 도깨비 고사), there are foods which Dokkaebi like.

Traditional Practices
It is believed that dokkaebi have immense supernatural powers, can bring good harvests, big catches and great fortunes to humans, and are defenders against evil spirits. Depending on the region's traditional folklore, some traditional practices are held to appeal to dokkaebi to bring good luck to humans and other practices are done to chase away dokkaebi, who are thought to be the causes of bad luck that brings fires and contagious diseases. In Jeju Island, the Durin-gut healing ceremony for mental illnesses is said to drive away the dokkaebi from the patient, similar to driving away the bad energy from a person.

Legends 
Many Korean legends have Dokkaebi featured in them. In several, Dokkaebi play pranks on mortals or punish them because of their evil deeds. One such tale describes an old man who lived alone on a mountain. One day, a Dokkaebi visited his house. Surprised, the kind old man gave the Dokkaebi an alcoholic beverage and they become friends. The Dokkaebi visited the old man often and they had long conversations together, but one day, the man took a walk by himself in the woods near the river. He discovered that his reflection looked like the Dokkaebi. He fear, and realized that he was gradually becoming that creature. The man made a plan to prevent himself from becoming a Dokkaebi and invited the creature to his house. He asked, "What are you most afraid of?" and the Dokkaebi answered, "I'm afraid of blood. What are you afraid of?" The man pretended to be frightened and said, "I'm afraid of money. That's why I live in the mountains by myself." The next day, the old man killed a cow and poured its blood all over his house. The Dokkaebi, with shock and great anger, ran away and said, "I'll be back with your greatest fear!" The next day, the Dokkaebi brought bags of money and threw it to the old man. After that, Dokkaebi never came back and the old man became the richest person in the town.

Kinds 

Although Dokkaebis have no actual form, some people divide them into types. These are some common types:

 Cham dokkaebi (literally really dokkaebi): A mischievous dokkaebi. Contrast with gae dokkaebi.
 Gae dokkaebi (literally wild dokkaebi): Evil dokkaebi. Contrast with Cham Dokkaebi.
 Gim Seobang dokkaebi (literally Mr. Kim Dokkaebi): A dumb dokkaebi that looks like a farmer.
 Nat dokkaebi (literally day dokkaebi): Unlike other , these appear during the daylight. They are known to give  to humans.
 Go dokkaebi (literally high dokkaebi): Dokkaebi known to be good at fighting and handling weapons, especially arrows.
 Gaksi dokkaebi (literally maiden dokkaebi) and chonggak dokkaebi (literally Bachelor Dokkaebi): Dokkaebi, known to attract humans.
 Oenun dokkaebi (literally one-eyed dokkaebi): A one-eyed dokkaebi that eats a lot.
 Oedari dokkaebi (literally one-legged dokkaebi): A one-legged dokkaebi that likes to play Ssireum.

Media
Based on the folktale of Goblin, the South Korean cable network tvN showcased a Television series called Guardian: The Lonely and Great God
() starring Gong Yoo as title role which was written by Kim Eun-sook, a notable writer in the industry. It earned 3rd place in the nationwide television ratings.

In 2017, K-pop girlgroup CLC released a song called Hobgoblin (KR: 도깨비; RR: dokkaebi), which lyrics seem to be casting a spell through seducing so it holds the attention of the listener. The formerly cute group brought a darker and sexier concept, as well a fresh EDM Trap sonority. The song succeeded at bringing attention and performed greatly overseas.

There is also a reference to a Dokkaebi in a video game called Tom Clancy's Rainbow Six Siege. Grace "Dokkaebi" Nam is an operator who uses Dokkaebi as her nickname in reference to her ability to mess with the opposing team's phones. 

Sujin, a non-binary dokkaebi, is a character in the novel Dragon Pearl by Yoon Ha Lee.

In September 2020, K-pop boy group A.C.E released a song called Goblin: Favorite Boys (KR:도깨비). In Korean fairy tales, traditional goblins like to wrestle with humans. Using that, their choreographer found a way for them to use traditional Korean wrestling in their choreography as well as in their clothing styling and set imagery.

An upcoming video game that prominently features dokkaebi, titled DokeV, and developed by South Korean video game developer Pearl Abyss, is currently in development as of August 2021.

In August 2021 the K-pop boy group Stray Kids made a "dokkaebi-theme" video for their comeback song Thunderous.

See also
 Tsukumogami, similar creatures in Japanese folklore

References

External links
 Dokkaebi story, Pa-in Folkpainting Research Institute 
 Korean Folklore - Goblins and Other Beings: KoreanHistoricalDramas.com (English)

Korean legendary creatures